This is a list of Israeli chess title-holders (active players only), as of April 2016.

Grandmasters
Boris Alterman
Boris Avrukh
Tal Baron
Sergey Erenburg
Alexander Finkel
Boris Gelfand
Alik Gershon
Vitali Golod
Alon Greenfeld
Yehuda Gruenfeld
Lev Gutman
Alexander Huzman
Boris Kantsler
Artur Kogan
Yona Kosashvili
Yair Kraidman
Ronen Lev
Eran Liss
Ilan Manor
Victor Mikhalevski
Vadim Milov
Jacob Murey
Tamir Nabaty
Michael Oratovsky
Evgeny Postny
Lev Psakhis
Gad Rechlis
Maxim Rodshtein
Michael Roiz
Ilya Smirin
Ram Soffer
Emil Sutovsky
Mark Tseitlin
Dov Zifroni
Yaacov Zilberman
Dan Zoler

Woman Grandmasters
Bella Igla
Ela Pitam
Tatiana Zatulovskaya
Dina Belenkaya

International Masters
Yochanan Afek
Vladimir Alterman
Roman Bar
Mark Berkovich
Nathan Birnboim
Igor Bitansky
Inon Boim
Angela Borsuk (also WGM)
Ilia Botvinnik
Ofer Bruk
Leonid Gerzhoy
Asaf Givon
Shimon Kagan
Alexander Kaspi
Ilya Khmelniker
Masha Klinova (also WGM)
Alexander Krayz
Alexander Kundin
Leon Lederman
Gaby Livshitz
Boris Maryasin
Alexander Mikhalevski
Gur Mittelman
Shay Porat
Eduard Porper
Alexander Rabinovich
Nati Ribshtein
Arkady Shevelev
Eliahu Shvidler
Yaacov Stisis
Maxim Uritzky
Eli Vovsha
Alik Vydeslaver
Uriel Zak

Woman International Masters
Marsel Efroimski
Maya Porat
Ludmila Tsifanskaya
Olga Vasiliev

Notable inactive players

Men
Yoel Aloni (M)
Amikam Balshan (M)
Yaacov Bernstein (M)
Zadok Domnitz (M)
Roman Dzindzichashvili (GM)
Uzi Geller (IM)
Emanuel Guthi (M)
Izaak Grynfeld (M)
Ronen Har-Zvi (GM)
Gedali Szapiro (M)
Leonid Yudasin (GM)

Women
Ljuba Kristol (WIM)

Notable deceased players

Men

Izak Aloni (M)
Abram Blass (M)
Yaacov Bleiman (IM)
Moshe Czerniak (IM)
Yosef Dobkin (M)
Boruch Israel Dyner (M)
David Enoch (M)
Zvulon Gofshtein (GM)
Zelman Kleinstein (M)
Vladimir Liberzon (GM)
Aleksandras Machtas (M)
Ariah Mohiliver (M)
Menachem Oren (M)
Raaphi Persitz (M)
Yosef Porat (IM)
Meir Rauch (M)
Leonid Shamkovich (GM)
Shlomo Smiltiner (M)
Isakas Vistaneckis (M)
Victor Winz (M)

Women 
 Alla Kushnir (WGM)

See also
List of Israelis
List of chess players

External links

Elo rating list of top 100 Israeli chess players 
OlimpBase, Men's Chess Olympiads, Israel

 
Israeli
Chess players
Chess in Israel